Wood Street is a railway station on the Chingford branch of the Lea Valley lines, located in Upper Walthamstow in the London Borough of Waltham Forest, east London. It has been operated by London Overground since 2015.

It is also occasionally known as "Walthamstow Wood Street". The station is in Travelcard Zone 4. The station is close to Whipps Cross University Hospital.

History
The station was opened in 1873 by the Great Eastern Railway.

On 13 February 1919 there was an accident at Wood Street when a passenger train ran into an empty stock train. Five people were injured – none seriously. The cause was a signal failure.

In 1923 the Great Eastern Railway became part of the London and North Eastern Railway, which in turn was merged into British Railways Eastern Region following nationalisation in 1948.

When construction of the London Underground's Victoria line was given parliamentary approval in 1955, the plan was to build the line past Walthamstow Central station to Wood Street, where the line would surface to terminate next to the British Railways station, on land previously used as a coal depot. Before construction work started, a decision was made in 1961 to omit the section beyond Walthamstow Central.

The line was electrified in 1960, and electric services commenced on 12 November. At first Class 305 EMUs were used, but initial technical problems led to their replacement by Class 302 and Class 304 EMUs.

The station had a goods depot, which closed on 6 May 1968.

In April 1994 Railtrack took over responsibility for the operation of the infrastructure. Train services have been operated since then by West Anglia Great Northern, National Express East Anglia, Abellio Greater Anglia and, by London Overground.

Engine shed
There was an engine shed located just north of Wood Street which was a sub-shed of Stratford TMD and was built in 1878. The engine shed was a two road affair with space for 6 tank locomotives – there was also a short siding for coal wagons. An additional siding was added c1934. By the 1950s the staff complement was 36 drivers, 36 Firemen and six Passed Cleaners although recruitment for what was a hard dirty job became more difficult during that decade.

On 1 January 1922 the allocation consisted of three GER Class M15 2-4-2Ts (later LNER Class F4), two GER Class C72 (later LNER Class J68) and eleven GER Class S56 (later LNER class J69) 0-6-0T engines.

In later years the main allocation of the shed was tank engines for working suburban services to and from London Liverpool Street and from the 1920s the allocation was exclusively the LNE N7 0-6-2T locomotives.

The shed was closed in 1960 when the line was electrified.

Services
Trains are operated by London Overground.

The typical off-peak weekday service pattern is:
4 trains per hour (tph) to London Liverpool Street;
4 tph to Chingford.

Journey times are 9 minutes to Chingford and 20 minutes to Liverpool Street.

Connections
London Buses routes 230 and W16 serve the station.

References

External links

Railway stations in the London Borough of Waltham Forest
Former Great Eastern Railway stations
Railway stations in Great Britain opened in 1873
Railway stations served by London Overground
Railway depots in London
Walthamstow
Unbuilt London Underground stations
Proposed London Underground stations